Eilema punctistriata is a moth of the subfamily Arctiinae. It was described by Arthur Gardiner Butler in 1882. It is found on Madagascar.

References

 

punctistriata
Moths described in 1882